Günther Golautschnig (born 22 November 1953) is an Austrian footballer. He played in one match for the Austria national football team in 1982.

References

External links
 

1953 births
Living people
Austrian footballers
Austria international footballers
Place of birth missing (living people)
Association footballers not categorized by position